Voeltzkowia mira is a species of skink which is endemic to Madagascar.

References

mira
Reptiles of Madagascar
Endemic fauna of Madagascar
Reptiles described in 1893
Taxa named by Oskar Boettger